The Bravery Council of Australia Meeting 72 Honours List was announced by the Governor General of Australia, Quentin Bryce  on 15 March 2010.

Awards were announced for 
the Star of Courage,
the Bravery Medal,
Commendation for Brave Conduct and
Group Bravery Citation.

Star of Courage

Ronald Gianoncelli, Western Australia, for resisting an armed robbery

References

Orders, decorations, and medals of Australia
2010 awards